Advanced Placement (AP) Computer Science Principles (also known as APCSP) is an AP Computer Science course and examination offered by the College Board to high school students as an opportunity to earn college credit for a college-level computing course. AP Computer Science Principles is meant to be the equivalent of a first-semester course in computing. Assessment for AP Computer Science Principles is divided into two parts, both an end of course exam as well as the creation of artifacts throughout the course.

AP Computer Science Principles examines a variety of computing topics on a largely conceptual level, and teaches procedural programming. In the Create "Through-Course Assessment", students must develop a program, demonstrated in a video and a written reflection. The course may be taught in any programming language with procedures, mathematical expressions, variables, lists, conditionals, and loops. Coding portions of the AP exam are based in both text-based and block-based pseudocode, as defined by the provided reference sheet.

The AP Computer Science Principles Exam was administered for the first time on May 5, 2017.

Course
The framework focuses on computational thinking practices which are applied throughout the curriculum. The concept outline included in the curriculum is divided into seven units called "Big Ideas". Each unit contains a series of "Learning Objectives". Each "Learning Objective" is a general benchmark of student performance or understanding which has an associated "Enduring Understanding". An "Enduring Understanding" is a core comprehension which students should retain well after completing the course. Each "Learning Objective" is split into multiple "Essential Knowledge" standards, which are specific facts or content which the student must know to demonstrate mastery of the  learning objective when assessed.

Through-Course Assessment 
Task 1: Create – Applications from Ideas
Task Description: Students create computational artifacts through the design and development of programs.
Task Time Limit: 12 hours in Class Time
Task Response Format
Individual Program: Source Code PDF and Video
Individual Reflection: 300 words
Evaluate, Archive and Present Task

Prior to 2021, the first task was the Explore section. The explore section was removed prior to the 2021 exam. The exam prior to 2021 is described as follows:
Task 1: Explore – Implications of Computing Innovations
Task Description: In the classroom, students explore the impacts of computing on social, economic, and cultural areas of our lives
Task Time Limit: 8 hours in Class Time
Task Response Format
Written Response: Innovation: 400 word Max
Written Response: Population and Impact : 300 Word Max
Visual Artifact: Visualization or Graphic
Visual Artifact Summary: 50 Words
Evaluate, Archive and Present Task

Exam 
The AP exam uses paper and pencil. (With the exception of year 2020, only Create and Explore were tested. In 2021, only Create and the multiple choice section were tested.)
It lasts 120 minutes and includes approximately 74 questions.
The exam is composed of two sections:
Single Select Multiple-Choice: Select 1 answer from among 4 options.
Multiple Select Multiple-Choice: Select 2 answers from among 4 options.

References

Computer science education
Advanced Placement